Israel Gustaf Kolmodin (24 December 1643 – 19 April 1709) was a Swedish hymnwriter and Lutheran priest, active in the Church of Sweden. He is usually credited for having written the song "Den blomstertid nu kommer."

References

1643 births
1709 deaths
Swedish Lutheran hymnwriters
17th-century Swedish Lutheran priests
18th-century Swedish Lutheran priests